This list contains all cultural property of national significance (class A) in the canton of Schwyz from the 2009 Swiss Inventory of Cultural Property of National and Regional Significance. It is sorted by municipality and contains 49 individual buildings, 8 collections, 10 archaeological finds and 1 other, special site or object.

The geographic coordinates provided are in the Swiss coordinate system as given in the Inventory.

Altendorf

Arth

Einsiedeln

Freienbach

Galgenen

Gersau

Ingenbohl

Küssnacht

Lachen

Morschach

Muotathal

Rothenthurm

Sattel

Schübelbach

Schwyz

Steinen

Tuggen

Wangen

References
 All entries, addresses and coordinates are from:

External links
 Swiss Inventory of Cultural Property of National and Regional Significance, 2009 edition:

PDF documents: Class B objects
Geographic information system